Milwaukee Public Library (MPL) is the public library system in Milwaukee, Wisconsin, United States, consisting of a central library and 13 branches, all part of the Milwaukee County Federated Library System. MPL is the largest  public library system in Wisconsin.

History
The Milwaukee Public Library can trace its lineage back to 1847 when the Young Men's Association started a subscription library that collected dues from its members. The group rented space for its library in a number of locations over the years and expanded into sponsoring a lecture series with such important speakers as Horace Mann, Horace Greeley and Ralph Waldo Emerson.

The city-sponsored library began in 1878 when the state legislature authorized Milwaukee to establish a public library. At that time, it took over the association's rented quarters and the group's collection of 10,000 volumes, many in German. After several moves and several fires, the library moved into a new, block-long limestone building at what is now 814 W. Wisconsin Avenue.

That building, which opened on Oct. 3, 1898, was shared with the Milwaukee Public Museum until the museum moved to its own building on West Wells Street in the mid-1960s. In 1929 when it still shared the space with the museum, the Library was home to a lion named Simba, who lived in the taxidermy department on the fourth floor. Simba "The Library Lion" was also known to play on the roof. In 1957, an addition to the Central Library building was opened on the Wells Street side. It included four fireproof levels of shelving below ground level.

The library system expanded by establishing book depositories at locations around the city, first in grocery stores, then in rented store buildings. On June 16, 1910, the South Division branch opened in its own building at what is now 931 W. Madison Street. In the 1960s the library system began a program to replace the storefront libraries and the outdated South Division branch and build new branch buildings throughout the city. Today there are 12 neighborhood libraries, each of which serves a population of about 50,000.  The most recently built branch library is the Good Hope Library, which opened on July 29, 2020. The Good Hope branch replaces the Mill Road branch, which closed permanently in March 2020. Other recent branch library renovations or replacements include East Library, which re-opened in a new building to the public on November 22, 2014; the Tippecanoe neighborhood branch, which was renovated in 2015; and the Mitchell Street branch, which opened on October 7, 2017 in the historic Hills Building on the city's near-south side.  The Mitchell Street branch replaces the Forest Home branch, which closed permanently in September 2017.

Central Library

The Central Library is the headquarters for the Milwaukee Public Library System. Designated a Milwaukee Landmark in 1969, the building remains one of Milwaukee's most monumental public structures.

Today, the Central Library occupies almost the entire building with 3 exceptions: the headquarters for the Milwaukee County Federated Library System; the Wisconsin Talking Book and Braille Library; and Audio & Braille Literacy Enhancement.

Branches
Atkinson
Bay View
Capitol
Center Street
East
Good Hope
Martin Luther King
Mitchell Street
MPL Express at Silver Spring
Tippecanoe
Villard Square Library
Washington Park
Zablocki

References

External links

Milwaukee County Federated Library System

Education in Milwaukee
Public libraries in Wisconsin
1878 establishments in Wisconsin
Works Progress Administration in Wisconsin